FS Class E.220 was a two-axle electric locomotive, powered by a third rail, built for operation on the Varese line of the Italian Rete Mediterranea (Mediterranean Network) and registered as RM 02. It was acquired by the Italian State Railways in 1918 and re-registered as 220.01. It remained a unique example.

Overview
The electrical equipment was supplied by General Electric. The total power output was 220 kW (1 hour) or 150 kW (continuous) and maximum speed was 50 km/h. The two traction motors were geared directly to the axles. It appears to have been "deported" by German troops fleeing in 1945 and abandoned in Austria where it was converted to power supply from accumulators. In 1961 it was in Linz awaiting scrapping.

References

Further reading
    Stefano Garzaro, Locomotive elettriche FS, editrice Elledì, 1986.
    Alessandro Albé, Le Varesine. L'avventura della terza rotaia dal 1900 al 1950. Le esperienze estere, Torino, editrice Elledì, collana Temi ferroviari, 1986.
    Giovanni Cornolò, Locomotive elettriche FS, Parma, Ermanno Albertelli Editore, 1983, pp. 31-32.

External links
 Photo of FS E220

650 V DC locomotives
Bo locomotives
E.220
Railway locomotives introduced in 1912
Standard gauge locomotives of Italy
Freight locomotives
Scrapped locomotives